Saparmyrat Atabayev (born 1999) is a Turkmen chess player. He was awarded the title of International Master in 2017.

Chess career

Atabayev has represented Turkmenistan in a number of Chess Olympiads. He was selected in 2014, but the team did not play any of their games.  In 2016 he scored 6/11 on board three, while in 2018 he scored 5½/11 on board two.

He qualified to play in the Chess World Cup 2021 where he was drawn against Viktor Erdős in the first round, but was unable to play.

References

External links

Saparmyrat Atabayew chess games at 365Chess.com

1999 births
Turkmenistan chess players
Chess Olympiad competitors
Living people